Events in the year 2013 in Hong Kong.

Incumbents
 Chief Executive - Leung Chun-ying

Events

March
 25 March - Hong Kong's Court of Final Appeal rules that foreign domestic workers are not allowed to become Hong Kong permanent residents.

April
 3 April - In cricket, United Arab Emirates defeats Hong Kong by 32 runs for the third place.

May
 3 May - The world's largest rubber duck is moved to Hong Kong.

June
 23 June - After a failed U.S. extradition request Hong Kong says does not fully comply with the law, U.S. whistleblower Edward Snowden leaves Hong Kong for Moscow.

September
 23 September - At least 25 people are dead in Hong Kong and southern China after Typhoon Usagi passes through with the storm having killed eight people in the Philippines.

See also
 List of Hong Kong films of 2013

References

 
Years of the 21st century in Hong Kong
Hong Kong
Hong Kong